Business India is a fortnightly business news magazine founded by brothers Ashok Hotchand Advani, Hiroo Advani and Rajkumar Advani in 1978 and published in Mumbai, India. In 2001, the magazine had a circulation of 88,100 copies and it increased to 526,000 in 2006. The magazine is considered pioneer of Indian business magazines. The magazine started publication in English but is now also available in other Indian languages.

References

External links
 Official website
 News and Magazine Coverage

1978 establishments in India
English-language magazines published in India
Biweekly magazines published in India
Business magazines published in India
Magazines established in 1978
Mass media in Mumbai